Mykhaylo Stepanovych Kozak (born 20 January 1991 in Milovice, Czechoslovakia) is a professional Ukrainian football midfielder who plays for Karpaty Halych.

Honours
Stal Alchevsk
 Ukrainian First League: Runner Up 2012–13

Oleksandriya
 Ukrainian First League: 2010–11

References

External links

1991 births
Living people
People from Milovice (Nymburk District)
Czech emigrants to Ukraine
Ukrainian footballers
Ukrainian expatriate footballers
Ukraine student international footballers
Ukraine youth international footballers
FC Lviv players
FC Oleksandriya players
FC Vorskla Poltava players
FC Desna Chernihiv players
FC Stal Alchevsk players
FC Rukh Lviv players
Ukrainian Premier League players
Expatriate footballers in Georgia (country)
Ukrainian expatriate sportspeople in Georgia (country)
Association football midfielders
Ukrainian First League players
FC Shevardeni-1906 Tbilisi players
FC Karpaty Halych players